This is a list of variants of the game Tetris.  It includes officially licensed Tetris sequels, as well as unofficial clones.

Official games

Unofficial games

See also
 List of puzzle video games

Notes

References

Tetris
Tetris
Tetris
Tetris
Tetris
Tetris
Tetris
Tetris
Tetris
Tetris
Tetris
Tetris
Tetris
Tetris
Tetris
Tetris
Tetris
Tetris
Tetris
Tetris
Tetris
Tetris
Tetris
Tetris
Tetris
Tetris